Frank is the debut studio album by English singer and songwriter Amy Winehouse. It was released on 20 October 2003 by Island Records. Production for the album took place during 2002 to 2003 and was handled by Winehouse, Salaam Remi, Commissioner Gordon, Jimmy Hogarth and Matt Rowe. Its title alludes to the nature and tone of Winehouse's lyrics on the album, as well as one of her influences, Frank Sinatra.

Upon its release, Frank received generally positive reviews from most music critics and earned Winehouse several accolades, including an Ivor Novello Award. The album has sold over one million copies in the United Kingdom and has been certified triple platinum by the British Phonographic Industry (BPI).

Background
After playing around with her brother's guitar, Winehouse bought her own when she was 15 and began writing music a year later. Soon after, she began working for a living, including, at one time, as an entertainment journalist for the World Entertainment News Network, in addition to singing with local group the Bolsha Band. In July 2000, she became the featured female vocalist with the National Youth Jazz Orchestra; her influences were to include Sarah Vaughan and Dinah Washington, the latter whom she was already listening to at home.

Winehouse's best friend, soul singer Tyler James, sent her demo tape to an artists and repertoire (A&R) executive. Winehouse signed to Simon Fuller's 19 Management in 2002 and was paid £250 a week against future earnings. While being developed by the management company, she was kept as a recording industry secret, although she was a regular jazz standards singer at the Cobden Club. Her soon-to-be A&R representative at Island Records, Darcus Beese, heard of her by accident when the manager of The Lewinson Brothers showed him some productions of his clients, which featured Winehouse as key vocalist. When he asked who the singer was, the manager told him he was not allowed to say. Having decided that he wanted to sign her, it took several months of asking around for Beese to eventually discover who the singer was. However, Winehouse had already recorded a number of songs and signed a publishing deal with EMI by this time. She formed a working relationship with producer Salaam Remi through these record publishers.

Beese introduced Winehouse to his boss, Nick Gatfield, and the Island head shared his enthusiasm in signing her. Winehouse was signed to Island, as rival interest in Winehouse had started to build to include representatives of EMI and Virgin starting to make moves. Beese told HitQuarters that he felt the reason behind the excitement, over an artist who was an atypical pop star for the time, was due to a backlash against reality TV music shows, which included audiences starved for fresh, genuine young talent.

In a 2004 interview with The Observer, Winehouse expressed dissatisfaction with the album, stating:

Some things on this album make me go to a little place that's fucking bitter. I've never heard the album from start to finish. I don't have it in my house. Well, the marketing was fucked, the promotion was terrible. Everything was a shambles. It's frustrating, because you work with so many idiots—but they're nice idiots. So you can't be like, "You're an idiot." They know that they're idiots.

Release and promotion
In the liner notes for Winehouse's 2011 album Lioness: Hidden Treasures, producer Salaam Remi wrote about the track "Half Time", an outtake from the recording sessions for Frank, and revealed that Franks title refers partly to Frank Sinatra, an early influence on Winehouse.

Frank was first released in the United Kingdom on 20 October 2003 through Island Records. In 2004, the album was released to European countries, including Poland and Germany, as well as being released in Canada through Universal Music Group.
In 2007 the album was released once again to Australia in March and the United States in November, with the latter being released via Universal Republic Records.

In 2008, the album was re-released as a deluxe edition, including an 18-track bonus disc of rare tracks, remixes, B-sides and live performances. It was first released in Germany on 9 May 2008, followed by its release in the United Kingdom on 12 May 2008 through Island Records. Over May, June and July the album was released in Australia, Canada, United States and Japan.

Following the release of the critically acclaimed documentary film about Winehouse, Amy (2015), Frank was reissued on vinyl on 31 July 2015 by Republic Records.

Critical reception

Frank received mostly positive reviews from contemporary music critics. At Metacritic, which assigns a normalised rating out of 100 to reviews from mainstream publications, the album received an average score of 78, based on 11 reviews. AllMusic's John Bush called Winehouse "an excellent vocalist possessing both power and subtlety". Nate Chinen of The New York Times complimented her original lyrics and called the music a "glossy admixture of breezy funk, dub and jazz-inflected soul". The A.V. Clubs Nathan Rabin commended its loose, organic songcraft and wrote that it "features languid, wide-open neo-soul grooves and jazzy vamping". Beccy Lindon of The Guardian described Winehouse's sound as "somewhere between Nina Simone and Erykah Badu ... at once innocent and sleazy". Entertainment Weeklys Chris Willman found its musical style reminiscent of Sade. MusicOMHs John Murphy said that her lyrics are "commendably feisty and, as the album title suggests, frank". Dan Cairns of The Times called Frank "a staggeringly assured, sit-up-and-listen debut, both commercial and eclectic, accessible and uncompromising". Robert Christgau, writing for MSN Music, was less enthusiastic and graded the album a "dud", indicating "a bad record whose details rarely merit further thought."

Winehouse was nominated for British Female Solo Artist and British Urban Act at the 2004 BRIT Awards, while Frank was shortlisted for the Mercury Music Prize that same year. The album earned Winehouse an Ivor Novello Award. In retrospective reviews for both Pitchfork and Rolling Stone, critic Douglas Wolk was ambivalent towards Winehouse's themes and felt that they are relevant to her public image at the time, writing in the former review, "in the light of her subsequent career, Frank comes off as the first chapter in the Romantic myth of the poet who feels too deeply and ends up killing herself for her audience's entertainment". By contrast, PopMatters writer Mike Joseph felt that the album shows that Winehouse's success is "based on pure talent rather than good producers or gimmicks". The Washington Posts Bill Friskics-Warren noted most of its content as "sultry ballads and shambling neo-soul jams", while writing that it "more than confirms what the fuss over Winehouse – then just 19 and with a lot fewer tattoos – was originally all about... her attitude and command were already there. And then some". The album was also included in the book 1001 Albums You Must Hear Before You Die. In 2019, the album was ranked 57th on The Guardian'''s 100 Best Albums of the 21st Century list.

Commercial performanceFrank entered the UK Albums Chart at number 60 before climbing to number 13 in late January 2004. Following Winehouse's death on 23 July 2011, the album re-entered the UK chart at number five, before reaching a new peak position of number three the following week, with 19,811 copies sold. The album was certified triple platinum by the British Phonographic Industry (BPI) on 19 December 2008, and had sold over one million copies as of September 2014.Frank debuted at number 61 on the Billboard 200 in the United States, selling 22,000 copies in its opening week. In the wake of Winehouse's death, the album sold 8,000 copies to re-enter the chart at number 57 on the issue dated 6 August 2011. The following week, it rose to a new peak of number 33 with sales of 12,000 copies. The album had sold 315,000 copies in the US by July 2011.

Elsewhere, the album charted inside the top five in Austria and Poland, and the top 10 in France, Germany, Ireland, Italy, Netherlands and Portugal. In late 2011, Frank was certified double platinum by the International Federation of the Phonographic Industry (IFPI) for sales in excess of two million copies across Europe.

Track listing

Notes
  signifies an additional producer
 "You Sent Me Flying" is based on an original demo recorded by Felix Howard, Paul Watson and Luke Smith.
 "Help Yourself" contains elements from "You Won't Be Satisfied (Until You Break My Heart)" written by Freddy James and Larry Stock.
 On some digital editions, the "Amy Amy Amy / Outro" medley is presented as five separate tracks.

Personnel
Credits adapted from the liner notes of Frank.

 Amy Winehouse – vocals, guitar, production
 21st Century Jazz – accompaniment
 John Adams – organ, Rhodes
 Robert Aaron – flute, saxophone
 Teodross Avery – saxophone
 Ian Barter – guitar
 Rudy Bird – percussion, shaker
 Houston "House" Bowen – engineering assistance
 Ben Bryant – engineering assistance
 Errol Campbell – drums, percussion
 Wilburn "Squiddley" Cole – drums
 Commissioner Gordon – drums, effects, engineering, mixing, percussion, production, programming, turntables
 Delroy "Chris" Cooper – bass
 Tom Coyne – mastering
 Cameron Craig – mixing
 Tanya Darby – trumpet
 Tom Elmhirst – mixing
 Jeni Fujita – backing vocals
 Vincent Henry – alto flute, alto saxophone, baritone saxophone, flute, tenor saxophone
 Jimmy Hogarth – bass, drums, guitar, mixing, percussion, production, programming
 Felix Howard – backing vocals
 Stafford Hunter – trombone
 Timothy Hutton – horn
 Donovan Jackson – keyboards, organ, Rhodes
 Gregory Jackson – bass
 Kate Lower – coordinator
 Michael Nash Associates – cover design
 Charles Moriarty – cover photography
 Gary "Mon" Noble – engineering, mixing
 Steve "Esp" Nowa – engineering assistance
 Valerie Phillips – photography
 John Piretti – engineering assistance
 Bruce Purse – baritone horn, bass trumpet, flugelhorn, trumpet
 Salaam Remi – arrangement, drum programming, drums, electric bass, electric upright bass, mixing, organ, percussion, production
 Jony Rockstar – additional production
 Matt Rowe – backing vocals, production, trumpet
 Jeremy Shaw – guitar
 Stefan Skarbek – backing vocals, trumpet
 Martin Slattery – Hammond organ, horn, Wurlitzer
 Earl "Chinna" Smith – guitar
 Luke Smith – bass, keyboards, piano
 Lenny Underwood – keyboards, piano
 Richard Wilkinson – additional drums
 Brent Williams – mixing assistance
 Troy Wilson – drums

Charts

Weekly charts

Year-end charts

Certifications

Release history

References

Bibliography

 

External links
 A B&S Classic Interview Before 'Rehab' at Blues & Soul''

2003 debut albums
Amy Winehouse albums
Albums produced by Salaam Remi
Contemporary R&B albums by English artists
Hip hop albums by English artists
Island Records albums
Frank Sinatra
Universal Republic Records albums